Silvino João de Carvalho (born May 20, 1981) commonly known as Jabá, is a Brazilian football player who currently plays for Clube Esportivo União.

Career
During the summer of 2009, Jabá moved to Azerbaijan Premier League side FC Baku.
On 1 February 2012, Jabá joined Antalyaspor until the end of the season.

In October 2014, Jabá resigned for FK Baku on a one-year contract.

Career statistics

References

External links

Jabá at ZeroZero

1981 births
Living people
Brazilian footballers
Turkish footballers
Brazilian football managers
Turkish football managers
Brazilian emigrants to Turkey
Turkish people of Brazilian descent
Coritiba Foot Ball Club players
Brazilian expatriate footballers
Brazilian expatriate sportspeople in Turkey
Expatriate footballers in Turkey
Expatriate footballers in Azerbaijan
Sportspeople from Pernambuco
Süper Lig players
Azerbaijan Premier League players
MKE Ankaragücü footballers
Antalyaspor footballers
Grêmio Esportivo Juventus players
Brazilian expatriate sportspeople in Azerbaijan
FC Baku players
Gebzespor footballers
Association football forwards
Converts to Islam